Cecil Airport  is a public airport and commercial spaceport located in Jacksonville, Florida, United States. It is owned by the Jacksonville Aviation Authority and services military aircraft, corporate aircraft, general aviation, and air cargo. The Florida Army National Guard's primary Army Aviation Support Facility and the U.S. Coast Guard's Helicopter Interdiction Tactical Squadron (HITRON) are also located here, the former operating CH-47 Chinook, UH-60 Blackhawk, UH-72 Lakota and C-12 Huron aircraft, and the latter operating the MH-65C Dolphin helicopter.

The airport has ARFF and structural fire protection provided by Jacksonville Fire/Rescue Station 56. Fire Station 73 (under construction) will be located on the airfield as well and will include ARFF, structural and rescue (ambulance) protection. A back-up, citywide 911 call/training center will also be located at Station 73.

Cecil Airport, commonly known as either "Cecil" or "Cecil Commerce Center", also houses the FSCJ (Florida State College Jacksonville) aviation course hangar and associated training aircraft. Sunrise Aviation, a flight training school and pilot supplies vendor is the flight training provider for FSCJ's aviation program. Facilities operated by major aerospace firms such as Logistic Services International (LSI), Boeing and Flightstar Aircraft Services are also located at Cecil, providing major training, maintenance and overhaul services for a variety of U.S. military aircraft.

In 2010, Cecil Airport became the United States' eighth licensed commercial spaceport and the first in Florida authorized to fly space vehicles that take off and land horizontally.

The NZC identifier was the airport's previous FAA identifier when it was Naval Air Station Cecil Field, its former name until its closure as a naval air station in 1999. The NZC IATA code is now allocated to Maria Reiche Neuman Airport serving Nazca, Peru .

History 

The airport is located on the site of the former Naval Air Station Cecil Field, which opened in 1941 and closed in 1999 following the 1993 Base Realignment and Closure Commission decision. Covering a total area of 22,939 acres (92.8 km²), it was the largest military base in the Jacksonville area and supported all Atlantic Fleet F/A-18 Hornet strike fighter squadrons and S-3 Viking sea control squadrons.

Facilities and aircraft 
Cecil Airport covers an area of 6,082 acres (24.61 km²) and contains four runways:

 Runway 18L/36R: 12,503 x 200 ft. (3,811 x 61 m), surface: asphalt/concrete
 Runway 18R/36L: 8,002 x 200 ft. (2,439 x 61 m), surface: asphalt/concrete
 Runway 9R/27L: 8,003 x 200 ft. (2,439 x 61 m), surface: asphalt/concrete
 Runway 9L/27R: 4,439 x 200 ft. (1,353 x 61 m), surface: asphalt/concrete

For the 12-month period ending February 5, 2018, the airport had 104,361 aircraft operations, an average of 286 per day: 52% military (53,899), 47% general aviation (49,372), <1% air carrier (744) and <1% air taxi (346). There were 92 aircraft based at this airport: 69 military, 17 single-engine, 2 multi-engine, 2 jet and 2 helicopter.

References

External links 

 Cecil Field page at the Jacksonville Aviation Authority website
  brochure from CFASPP
 Cecil Spaceport Cecil Spaceport in Jacksonville website
 Jacksonville JetPort FBO at Cecil Airport
 
 

Airports in Jacksonville, Florida
Spaceports in the United States
Westside, Jacksonville